The Dakota Ojibway Tribal Council (DOTC) is an Tribal Council of First Nations communities in Manitoba, Canada. Its mission statement indicates that the council's purpose is to "facilitate in the transfer of local control and responsibility of programs and services to member bands."

History
DOTC was established in Brandon, Manitoba, in August 1974 which essentially involved the South West Region of the Manitoba Indian Brotherhood.

Members
When DOTC was founded, it had 10 members. Since then, the council has gained and lost members.

Current members
Birdtail Sioux First Nation
Dakota Tipi First Nation
Long Plain First Nation 
Roseau River Anishinabe First Nation 
Sandy Bay First Nation  
Swan Lake First Nation

Former members
Canupawakpa Dakota First Nation
Dakota Plains Wahpeton Nation
Sioux Valley Dakota Nation
Waywayseecappo First Nation

Services
Dakota Ojibway Community Futures Development Corporation
 Dakota Ojibway Health Services
 Dakota Ojibway Tribal Council Administration & Finance
 Dakota Ojibway Tribal Council Advisory Department
Dakota Ojibway Tribal Council Education Services
Dakota Ojibway Tribal Council Housing Authority
 Dakota Ojibway Tribal Council Social Development
Manitoba First Nation Police Service
Yellowquill College

References

External links
Dakota Ojibway Tribal Council

 
First Nations governments in Manitoba
Ojibwe governments